Ledi-Geraru is a paleoanthropological research area in Mille district, Afar Region,  northeastern Ethiopia, along the Ledi and Geraru rivers (two left tributaries of the  Awash,  south of the Mille river). It stretches for about 50 km,  located just to the northeast of the   Hadar paleoanthropological area.

Early research was conducted in 1972–1974 The Ledi-Geraru Research Project was launched in 2002. 
The site is known for its early stone tools, dated about 2.6 million years old. A hominin mandible was found in 2013, known as LD 350-1 and dated 2.8 million years old, which may qualify as a very early specimen of the genus Homo.

LD 350-1

LD 350-1 is a fossil hominin mandible fragment discovered in 2013 at the Ledi-Geraru site. It was found by Chalachew Seyoum, an Ethiopian graduate student in the Institute of Human Origins at Arizona State University.  
The fossil was stratigraphically dated to 2.80 to 2.75 million years old.

It has been described as combining "primitive traits seen in early Australopithecus with derived morphology observed in later Homo.  
The fossil is the left mandibular body, but does not include the ascending ramus. It has attached the three molars, both premolars, and the left canine, some of which have complete crowns.

See also
Afar Triangle
List of human evolution fossils

References 

 

Afar Region
Archaeological sites in Ethiopia
Archaeological sites of Eastern Africa